"This Is Tomorrow" is a song by Bryan Ferry, the former lead vocalist for Roxy Music. It was released in 1977 as the first single from In Your Mind, his fourth solo album but the first consisting entirely of original songs. It was Ferry's tenth single. The single features the non-album track, "As the World Turns" as the B-side. The song peaked at number 9 in the UK Singles Chart, during its nine week run.

Background
The title, "This Is Tomorrow" was inspired by a 1956 exhibition of pop art at the Whitechapel Art Gallery in London, devised by Richard Hamilton, who had taught Ferry at Newcastle University.

Personnel
Musicians
 Bryan Ferry – lead vocals, keyboards 
 Chris Spedding – guitar
 Paul Thompson – drums
 John Wetton – bass guitar
 David Skinner – piano, keyboards
 Mel Collins – saxophone
 Martin Drover – trumpet
 Chris Mercer – saxophone

References

External links
 

1977 singles
Bryan Ferry songs
Songs written by Bryan Ferry
Polydor Records singles
1977 songs